Senecio nivalis, a flowering herb native to South America.

Distribution
Ecuador, Peru, Bolivia.

References

nivalis
Flora of South America